Englerocharis is a genus of flowering plants belonging to the family Brassicaceae.

Its native range is Peru and Bolivia.

The genus name of Englerocharis is in honour of Adolf Engler (1844–1930), a German botanist, and also; charis, a Greek word meaning "grace, kindness, and life". It was first published and described in Bot. Jahrb. Syst. Vol.40 on page 276 in 1908. 

Known species:
Englerocharis ancashensis 
Englerocharis blanca-leoniae 
Englerocharis cuzcoensis 
Englerocharis dentata 
Englerocharis pauciflora 
Englerocharis peruviana

References

Brassicaceae
Brassicaceae genera
Plants described in 1908
Flora of Peru
Flora of Bolivia